

Events and publications

Year overall 
 Following up their various Giant-Size series from 1974, Marvel Comics publishes a number of one-shot Giant-Size annuals, which feature reprints of "classic" Captain America, Captain Marvel, Daredevil, Doctor Strange, Hulk, Invaders, Iron Man, Power Man, and Thor stories. In addition, the company publishes three Giant-Size issues (January, April, and July cover dates) of Kid Colt, and two Giant-Size issues (May and June cover dates) of the reprint title Marvel Triple Action. On the other hand, the company cancels 10 Giant-Size titles, including Giant-Size Avengers, Giant-Size Conan, Giant-Size Defenders, Giant-Size Fantastic Four, Giant-Size Man-Thing, Giant-Size Master of Kung Fu, Giant-Size Spider-Man, Giant-Size Super-Villain Team-Up, Giant-Size Werewolf, and Giant-Size X-Men.
 The horror/suspense comic resurgence ends, as publishers cancel titles in droves. Marvel and its black-and-white magazines are particularly hard hit, canceling Adventure Into Fear, Dead of Night, Dracula Lives!, Giant-Size Chillers, Giant-Size Werewolf, Haunt of Horror, both Man-Thing titles, Masters of Terror, Monsters Unleashed, Supernatural Thrillers, Tales of the Zombie, Vampire Tales, and Where Monsters Dwell. DC Comics cancels Black Magic, Secrets of Haunted House, Tales of Ghost Castle, and Weird Mystery Tales. Gold Key Comics cancels Mystery Comics Digest, and Archie Comics even cancels their title Red Circle Sorcery.
Newspaper strip Cecil C. Addle by Ray Collins begins publication

January 
 January 20: The New Yorker publishes a strange comic strip by cartoonist George Booth, involving cave people with a strange vocabulary. Titled  Ip Gissa Gul, it becomes a classic afterwards. 
 January 23-26: Will Eisner is the first American to win the Grand Prix de la ville d'Angoulême at the annual Comics Festival of Angoulême.
 DC Comics raises the price of its typical comic book from 20 cents to 25 cents, keeping the page-count at 36.

February 
 The final issue of the Lucky Luke monthly magazine is published.

Spring 
 DC Special (1968 series) is revived with issue #16; the title had ceased publishing in 1971. (DC Comics)
 Art Spiegelman, Diane Noomin and Bill Griffith establish the underground comix magazine Arcade.

March 
 Adventure Comics #438: A "Seven Soldiers of Victory" script by Joseph Samachson written in the 1940s was serialized as a backup feature in Adventure Comics beginning with issue #438 and running through #443, with each chapter illustrated by a different artist including Dick Dillin, Howard Chaykin, Lee Elias, Mike Grell, Ernie Chan, and José Luis García-López.

April 
 April 1: The first issue of the French satirical comics magazine Fluide Glacial is published.
 April 1: The first episode of Moebius' Arzach is prepublished in Métal Hurlant.
 Detective Comics, with issue #446, resumes a monthly schedule, after going bi-monthly in June/July 1973. (DC Comics)

May
 Giant-Size X-Men #1, written by Len Wein and illustrated by Dave Cockrum (Marvel Comics). First appearance of the new X-Men Colossus, Storm, Nightcrawler, and Thunderbird
In Disney Magazine  #1, The Case of the Pea Soup Burglaries, by Carl Fallberg and Al Hubbard, first chapter of the saga Mickey and the Sleuth.

July
 Canadian publisher Comely Comix, based in Winnipeg, Manitoba, debuts with Captain Canuck #1.
 The Buyer's Guide to Comics Fandom switches to weekly publication.

August
 August 13: In Charles M. Schulz' Peanuts Spike, brother of Snoopy, makes his debut.
 August 16: Jean-Pierre Girerd's On à Volé la Coupe Stanley is serialized in La Presse. The story will run until 19 June 1976.
 Uncanny X-Men #94 — first issue of title featuring the new X-Men. Written by Chris Claremont; he will write the title continuously for the next 17 years.

Fall 
 Atlas/Seaboard Comics folds, after parts of two years in business, having published 23 comics titles and five comics magazines.

September
 September 12: Patty Klein and Jan Steeman's Noortje makes its debut in the Dutch girls' magazine Tina. It will run for 41 years, becoming the longest-running Dutch comic strip by the same creative team.
  The first issue of the Dutch alternative comics magazine De Vrije Balloen is published.

October 
 October 3: The final issues Dutch comics magazines Sjors and Pep are published and both are merged into a new magazine which is first published on this date: Eppo. In 1985 it changes its name to Eppo Wordt Vervolgd, to tie in with the popular TV show Wordt Vervolgd about comics and cartoons.
 October 13 The first issue of the German children's comics magazine Yps is published and will run until 10 October 2000. It will be relaunched on 11 October 2012 as an adult magazine. 
 October 24: The Nero story De Groene Gravin by Marc Sleen begins publication in the newspapers and introduces Clo-Clo, the moustached son of Madam Pheip and Meneer Pheip.
 Marvel debuts three new ongoing titles, The Champions, The Inhumans, and Marvel Presents. Simultaneously, it cancels six ongoing titles: Giant-Size Fantastic Four, Man-Thing, Outlaw Kid (vol. 2), Supernatural Thrillers, War is Hell, and Where Monsters Dwell.

November 
 November 13: Belgian comic artist Marc Sleen is honored with the Golden Cross of Officer in the Brabant Order of Merit. 
 Skartaris introduced in 1st Issue Special #8. (DC Comics)
 Korak, Son of Tarzan, with issue #60, changes its name to Tarzan Family. (DC Comics)

December
 December 28: In the Italian Disney magazine Topolino 1048, Ellsworth's Ornery Orphan by Romano Scarpa, Ellroy, the adoptive son of Ellsworth makes his debut.
Secrets of Haunted House, with issue #5 (December  1975/January  1976 cover date), goes on hiatus (DC Comics).
 In Almanacco Topolino, more specifically the story Paperino e il piccolo Krak by Marco Rota and Gaudenzio Cappelli, Andold Wild Duck makes his debut.

Specific date unknown
 Costa Rican artist Carlos Alvarado Salazar creates Carlos Pincel.
 Maurice Tillieux and Jijé receive the Stripschapprijs.

Births

Deaths

January 
 January 4: Bob Montana, American comics artist (Archie Comics), dies at age 54 of a heart attack.
 January 19: Marino Benejam Ferrer, Spanish comics artist (La Familia Ulises, Morcillón y Babalí, Los Grandes Inventos de TBO), passes away at age 84.

February
 February 9: Blanche Dumoulin, aka Davine, Belgian comics artist and writer (Spirou, Les Aventures de Zizette), passes away from cancer at age 80.
 February 20: Artie Simek, American comics letterer (Marvel Comics), dies at age 59.
 February 28: Robert Lips, Swiss comics artist (Globi), passes away at age 62.

March
 March 2: Salvador Mestres, Spanish animator and comics artist (Tom Relámpango, El Tresoro Maldito, Mae Blond la Mujer Fantasma, El Héroe Público No. 1 contra el Enemigo Público No. 1, Gong!, Guerra en la Estratosfera), dies at age 64 or 65.

April
 April 3: Otto Soglow, American comics artist (The Little King), dies at age 74.
 April 11: Huibert Vet, Dutch illustrator and comics artist, dies at age 55.
 April 19: Jim Navoni, American comics artist (continued Have You Seen Alonso?), dies at age 87.

May
 May 1: José Peñarroya, Spanish comics artist (Don Pío, Calixto, Gordito Relleno, Don Berrinche, Pedrusco Brutote, La Familia Pi, Floripondia Piripi, Viborita, Pepe, el Hincha, Don José Calmoso, Pitagorín), dies at age 64 or 65.
 May 8: George Baker, American comics artist (The Sad Sack), dies at age 59.
 May 25: Pal Korcsmaros, Hungarian journalist, illustrator and comic artist (comics based on literary classics), dies at age 61.

June
 June 3: Victor Dancette, French playwright and comics writer (La Bête est Morte), passes away at age 74.

July
 July 11: Crockett Johnson, American comics artist (Barnaby) and illustrator (Harold and the Purple Crayon), dies at age 68.
 July 18: Vaughn Bodé, American comics artist (Cheech Wizard, Cobalt 60), dies of autoerotic asphyxiation at age 33.

August
 August 5: Bob Karp, American comics writer (The Donald Duck newspaper comic), dies at age 64.
 August 6: Horacio Rodríguez Suría, Cuban comics artist (Bola de Nieve, Mango Macho y Cascarita, Pelusa y Pimienta, El Profesor Timbeque), dies at age 73.
 August 13: 
 Thornton Fisher, American comics artist (The Wishing Wisp, The Marrying of Mary), dies at age 87.
 Ogden Whitney, American comic artist (Herbie Popnecker, worked on Skyman), dies at age 56.
 August 17: René Bastard, French comics artist (Yves Le Loup), dies at age 74.
 August 22: Lancelot Hogben, British experimental zoologist and medical statistician (author of From Cave Paintings to Comic Strip: A Kaleidoscope of Human Communication), dies at age 79.

September
 September 15: Carlos Conti, Spanish comics writer (Felipe Gafe, Superlópez), and artist (El Loco Carioco, Apolino Tarúguez, hombre de negocios, Mi tío Magdaleno, La vida adormilada de Morfeo Pérez, Don Fisgón, Don Alirón, El doctor No y su ayudante Sí), dies at age 59.

October
 October 2: Ton van Tast, Dutch illustrator, caricaturist, painter, lithographer and comics artist (De Daverende Dingen Dezer Dagen), dies at age 91.
 October 26: Asmo Alho, Finnish comics artist (Kieku ja Kaiku), dies at age 72.

November
 November 1: Mel Graff, American comics writer and artist (The Adventures of Patsy, assisted on Secret Agent X-9, continued Wash Tubbs and Captain Easy), dies at age 67 or 68.
 November 5: Sigurd Lybeck, Norwegian writer and comics writer (Jens von Bustenskjold), dies at age 80.

December
 December 13: John Millar Watt, British comics artist (Pop), dies at age 80.
 December 14: Ben Thompson, American comics artist (Listen to This One, The Masked Marvel, Hydroman, Rainbow Boy, The Music Master), passes away at age 69.
 December 18: Ray Bailey, American animator and comics artist (Vesta West, Bruce Gentry, Space Cadet Tom Corbett), dies at age 62.
 December 24: Harold Mack, British animator and comics artist (Les Aventures des Deux Barbus), passes away at the age 67.

Specific date unknown
 Arturo Lanteri, Argentine comics artist and film director (Les Aventuras de Negro Raúl, Don Pancho Talero, Anacleto), passes away at age 93 or 94.
 Sergej Solovjev, Russian-Serbian comics atist dies at age 73 or 74.

Exhibitions and shows 
 18 Oct–2 Nov: Institute of Contemporary Arts (London, England, U.K.) — "Marvel: Exhibition of Original Marvel Comics Art Work"

Conventions 
 Cosmicon IV (York University Winters College, Toronto, Ontario, Canada) — final iteration of this multi-genre convention; official guests include Bernie Wrightson, Howard Chaykin, Joe Staton, Tom Sutton, Ralph Reese, Jeff Jones, Johnny Craig, Vincent Marchesano, Scott Edelman, and Marv Wolfman
 Ohiocon '75 (Youngstown, Ohio) — program booklet, edited by Joe Zabel, includes a history of the Youngstown Comic Art Association
 Pittcon '75 (Pittsburgh, Pennsylvania)
 January: Cincinnati Comic Convention (Netherland Hilton, Cincinnati, Ohio) — first annual show, produced by comics retailer the Yellow Kid Comics Shoppe
 March: Mid-America Comic Convention (Holiday Inn, Cincinnati, Ohio) — sponsored by Northern Kentucky's only comic book shop, the Northern Kentucky Bookstore
 March 22–24: Mighty Marvel Comicon (Hotel Commodore, New York) — first annual show, produced by Marvel Comics
 April 26: Manchester comic convention (Manchester, UK) — affectionately known as "Man-Con"
 Summer: Nostalgia '75, fourth annual Chicago Comic and Nostalgia Convention (Chicago, Illinois) — produced by Nancy Warner
 June 19–22: Multicon '75 (Oklahoma City, Oklahoma) — produced by OAF (Oklahoma Alliance of Fans); guests include George Takei, George Pal, Spanky McFarland, Bret Morrison, Jim Bannon, Al Williamson, and Steve Barrington
 June 25–29: Houstoncon '75 (Royal Coach Inn, Houston, Texas) — merged with the Houston Star Trek convention; guests include C. C. Beck, George Takei, Jock Mahoney, John Wooley, and Don "Red" Barry (Beck and Barry serve as judges for the costume contest)
 July 3–7: Comic Art Convention (Hotel Commodore, New York City)
 July 30 – August 3: San Diego Comic-Con (El Cortez Hotel, San Diego, California) — 1,100 attendees; official guests: Robert Bloch, Will Eisner, Mark Evanier, Gil Kane, Jack Katz, Stan Lee, Dick Moores, Chuck Norris, Don Rico, Jerry Siegel, Jim Starlin, Jim Steranko, and Theodore Sturgeon
 August: Cleveland Comic Convention ("Cleveland Comix Convention") (Sheraton Hotel, Cleveland, Ohio) — produced by Vladimir Swyrinsky; guests include Tony Isabella
 August 1–3: Toronto Triple Fan Fair a.k.a. "Fan Fair 3" (King Edward Hotel, Toronto, Ontario, Canada) — Guests of Honour: Lester del Rey and Cy Chauvin; 600 attendees
 August 2–3: Comicon '75 (British Comic Art Convention) (Regent Centre Hotel, London, England) — organized by Rob Barrow; guests include Frank Hampson and Paul Neary
 August 22–24: Atlanta Comics & Fantasy Fair (Ramada Inn, Atlanta, Georgia) — first iteration of this event; official guests include Stan Lee, Kenneth Smith, and collector Mike Curtis 
 September: OrlandoCon '75 (Orlando, Florida) — guests include Harvey Kurtzman, Burne Hogarth, Roy Crane, and Hal Foster
 Fall/Winter: Lancaster Comic Art Convention (Lancaster, Pennsylvania) — produced by Chuck Miller and Charlie Roberts; guests include Jim Steranko
 November 7–9: Famous Monsters Convention (Commodore Hotel, New York City) — guests include James Warren, Forrest J Ackerman, Peter Cushing, Verne Langdon, Ingrid Pitt, and Barbara Leigh
 December 18–21: MiamiCon I (Americana Hotel, Miami Beach, Florida) — 3,000 attendees; guests include Stan Lee, Jack Kirby, Neal Adams, C. C. Beck, James Doohan; admission price: $3.50

First issues by title

DC Comics 
Batman Family
 Release: September /October  Editor: Julius Schwartz.

Beowulf
 Release: April /May. Writer: Michael Uslan. Artist: Ricardo Villamonte.

Claw the Unconquered
 Release: May/June. Writer: David Michelinie. Artist: Ernie Chua.

First Issue Special
 Release: April. Writer/Artist: Jack Kirby.

Hercules Unbound
 Release: October /November  Writer: Gerry Conway. Artists: José Luis García-López and Wally Wood.

The Joker: arguably the first regular series to feature a villain.
 Release: May. Writer: Dennis O'Neil. Artist: Irv Novick and Dick Giordano.

Justice, Inc.
 Release: May/June. Writer: Dennis O'Neil. Artist: Al McWilliams.

Kong the Untamed
 Release: June/July. Writer: Jack Oleck. Artist: Alfredo Alcala.

Man-Bat
 Release: December  1975/January  1976. Writer: Gerry Conway. Artists: Steve Ditko and Al Milgrom.

Richard Dragon, Kung Fu Fighter
 Release: April /May. Writer: Jim Dennis. Artist: Leo Duranona.

Secrets of Haunted House
 Release: April /May. Editor: Joe Orlando.

Sherlock Holmes
 Release: September /October  Writers: Denny O'Neil (adaptation) and Arthur Conan Doyle (original story). Artists: E.R. Cruz.

Stalker
 Release: June/July. Writer: Paul Levitz. Artist: Steve Ditko.

Super-Team Family
 Release: October/November  Editor: Gerry Conway.

Tales of Ghost Castle
 Release: May/June Editor: Tex Blaisdell.

Tor: first DC issue, featuring reprints of a Kubert character created in 1953.
 Release: May/June Writer/Artist: Joe Kubert.

Marvel Comics 
The Champions
 Release: October. Writer: Tony Isabella. Artists: Don Heck and Mike Esposito.

Doc Savage: Man of Bronze
 Release: August by Curtis Magazines. Writer: Doug Moench. Artists: John Buscema and Tony DeZuniga.

Giant-Size Chillers
 Release: February.

Giant-Size Super-Villain Team-Up
 Release: March. Editor: Roy Thomas.

Giant-Size X-Men
 Release: May. Writer: Len Wein. Artist: Dave Cockrum.

The Inhumans
 Release: October. Writer: Doug Moench. Artists: George Pérez and Frank Chiaramonte.

The Invaders
 Release: August. Writer: Roy Thomas. Artists: Frank Robbins and Vince Colletta.

Kull and the Barbarians
 Release: May by Curtis Magazines. Writer/Editor: Roy Thomas.

Marvel Feature vol. 2
 Release: November. Editor: Roy Thomas.

Marvel Presents
 Release: October. Writer: John Warner. Artists: Mike Vosburg, Pat Boyette, and Bob McLeod.

Marvel Preview
 Release: Winter by Magazine Management/Curtis Magazines. Editor: Roy Thomas.

Masters of Terror
 Release: July by Curtis Magazines. Editor: Tony Isabella.

Skull the Slayer
 Release: August. Writer: Marv Wolfman. Artist: Steve Gan.

Super-Villain Team-Up
 Release: August. Writer: Tony Isabella.

Unknown Worlds of Science Fiction
 Release: January by Magazine Management/Curtis Magazines. Editor: Roy Thomas.

Other publishers 
Arcade
 Release: Spring by The Print Mint. Editors: Art Spiegelman and Bill Griffith.

Arzach
 Artist/Writer: Jean Giraud.

Battle Picture Weekly
 Release: March 8 by IPC Magazines. Editor: Pat Mills.

Big Apple Comix
 Release: by Big Apple Productions. Editor: Flo Steinberg.

Captain Canuck
 Release: July by Comely Comix. Writer/Artist: Richard Comely.

The Demon Hunter
Release: September by Atlas/Seaboard Comics. Writer: David Anthony Kraft Artist: Rich Buckler

Doomsday + 1
 Release: July by Charlton Comics. Writer: Joe Gill. Artist: John Byrne.

Scary Tales
 Release: August  by Charlton Comics. Editor: George Wildman.

Zombie Hunter
 Release: May by Kadokawa Shoten. Writer: Kazumasa Hirai. Artist: Yang Kyung-il

Canceled titles

DC Comics 
 Black Magic, with issue #9 (April /May)
 Justice, Inc., with issue #4 (November /December )
 Rima, the Jungle Girl, with issue #7 (April /May)
 The Sandman, with issue #6 (December  1975/January  1976)
 Sherlock Holmes, with issue #1 (September )
 Stalker, with issue #4 (December  1975/January  1976)
 Tales of Ghost Castle, with issue #3 (September /October ).
 Young Romance, with issue #208 (November /December ) — generally considered the first romance comic
 Weird Mystery Tales, with issue #24 (November )

Marvel Comics 
 Adventure into Fear, with issue #31 (December )
 Dead of Night, with issue #11 (August )
 The Frankenstein Monster, with issue #18 (September )
 Giant-Size Avengers, with issue #5 (December )
 Giant-Size Chillers, with issue #3 (August )
 Giant-Size Conan, with issue #5 (Fall)
 Giant-Size Defenders, with issue #5 (July)
 Giant-Size Fantastic Four, with issue #6 (October)
 Giant-Size Man-Thing, with issue #5 (August )
 Giant-Size Master of Kung Fu, with issue #4 (June)
 Giant-Size Spider-Man, with issue #6 (Fall)
 Giant-Size Super-Villain Team-Up, with issue #2 (June)
 Giant-Size Werewolf, with issue #5 (July)
 Giant-Size X-Men, with issue #2 (Fall) — reprinted "classic" Roy Thomas/Neal Adams X-Men stories
 Man-Thing, with issue #22 (October )
 Outlaw Kid (vol. 2), with issue #30 (October )
 Supernatural Thrillers, with issue #15 (October )
 Unknown Worlds of Science Fiction, with issue #6 (November )
 War is Hell, with issue #15 (October )
 Western Gunfighters (1970 series), with issue #33 (November )
 Where Monsters Dwell, with issue #38 (October )

Curtis Magazines 
 Dracula Lives!, with issue #13 (July)
 Haunt of Horror, with issue #5 (January )
 Kull and the Barbarians, with issue #3 (September )
 Masters of Terror, with issue #2 (September )
 Monsters Unleashed, with issue #11 (April )
 Savage Tales, with issue #11 (July)
 Tales of the Zombie, with issue #10 (March )
 Vampire Tales, with issue #11 (June)

Other publishers 
 E-Man vol. 1, with issue #10 (Charlton, September )
 Mystery Comics Digest, with issue #26 (Gold Key, October )
 Red Circle Sorcery, with issue #11 (Red Circle Comics/Archie Comics, February )

Initial appearance by character name

DC Comics 
Atlas, in 1st Issue Special #01 (April)
Bronze Tiger, in Richard Dragon, Kung Fu Fighter #01 (April /May)
 Claw the Unconquered, in Claw the Unconquered #01 (June)
Deimos, in 1st Issue Special #08 (November)
 Dingbats of Danger Street, in 1st Issue Special #06 (September)
Esper Lass, in Superboy Starring the Legion of Super-Heroes #212 (October)
Richard Dragon, in Richard Dragon, Kung Fu Fighter #01 (April /May)
 Golden Eagle, in Justice League of America #116 (March)
 Green Team: Boy Millionaires, in 1st Issue Special #02 (May)
 Kong the Untamed, in Kong the Untamed #01 (June/July)
 Lady Cop, in 1st Issue Special #04 (July)
 Lady Shiva, in Richard Dragon, Kung Fu Fighter #05 (December)
 Lucien, in Weird Mystery Tales #18 (May)
Mark Shaw, in 1st Issue Special #05 (August)
 Sterling Silversmith, in Detective Comics #446 (April)
Warlord, in 1st Issue Special #08 (November)

Marvel Comics 
 Vance Astrovik, in Giant-Size Defenders #5 (July)
 Janice Foswell, in Marvel Team-Up #39 (November)
 Gloria Grant, in The Amazing Spider-Man #140 (January)
 Harold H. Harold, in Tomb of Dracula #37 (October)
 Korvac, in Giant-Size Defenders #3 (January)
 Stephen Lang, in X-Men #96 (December)
 Moira MacTaggert, in X-Men #96 (December)
 Jamie Madrox, in Giant-Size Fantastic Four #4 (February)
 Master Man, in Giant-Size Invaders #1
 Moon Knight, in Werewolf by Night #32 (August)
 Moses Magnum, in Giant-Size Spider-Man #4 (April)
 Nova, in Fantastic Four #164 (November)
 Illyana Nikolievna Rasputin, in Giant-Size X-Men #1 (May)
 Razor Fist (William Young), in Master of Kung Fu #29 (June)
 Ben Reilly, in The Amazing Spider-Man #149 (October)
 Shroud, in Super-Villain Team-Up #5 (April)
 Straw Man, in Dead of Night #11 (August)
 U-Man, in Invaders #3 (November)
 White Tiger, in Deadly Hands of Kung Fu #19 (December)
 new X-Men, in Giant-Size X-Men #1 (May)
 Colossus
 Nightcrawler
 Storm
 Thunderbird

Other publishers 
 Captain Canuck, in Captain Canuck #1 (July)

References